Miasma may refer to:

 Miasma (Greek mythology), a contagious power that has an independent life of its own

Medicine
 Miasma theory, bad air causing disease
 Miasm, a specious cause of chronic disease

Music
 Miasma (album), a 2005 album by The Black Dahlia Murder, or the title track
 Miasma (EP), a 2001 EP by Hecate Enthroned
 Miasma, a 1987 album by The Bevis Frond
 "Miasma" (Ghost song), 2018